Monard may refer to:
 Monard, County Cork, townland close to Cork city, Ireland
 Monard, County Tipperary, Ireland, a townland; see List of townlands of County Tipperary
 Albert Monard (1886–1952), zoologist from whom are named:
 Monard's dormouse 
 Monard's African climbing mouse